Aphinya Pharksupho (born 25 December 1976) is a Thai weightlifter. Among her achievements is a tenth place in 69 kg at the 2000 Summer Olympics in Sydney.

References

External links

1976 births
Living people
Aphinya Pharksupho
Aphinya Pharksupho
Weightlifters at the 2000 Summer Olympics
Weightlifters at the 1998 Asian Games
Aphinya Pharksupho
Aphinya Pharksupho